The Government Navy (Gouvernementsmarine in Dutch or GM) was a Dutch naval force which stemmed from the Colonial Navy in the former Dutch East Indies.

It existed from 1861 to 1949 and operated in a civil-administrative role alongside the Royal Netherlands Navy. It was primarily focused on tasks such as policing and transport.

Commanders (Gezaghebbers)

References

Sources
 
 
 
 
 
 

Dutch East Indies
Naval history of the Netherlands
1861 establishments in the Netherlands
1949 disestablishments in the Netherlands
Military units and formations established in 1861
Military units and formations disestablished in 1949